Edmonton International Speedway, also known as Speedway Park, was a  multi-track auto racing facility located in the present Cumberland and Hudson neighbourhoods of Edmonton, Alberta, Canada. The facility featured a  dragstrip, a  14-turn road course, and a -mile short oval. At its peak, it had capacity for over 30,000 fans.

History

In the late 1940s, the dirt-surfaced Breckenridge Oval opened on the site. In 1952, the oval was shortened and paved as a -mile asphalt oval, and the 8,000-seat facility was renamed Speedway Park.

In 1968, the road course opened in time for the first Can-Am race. Over the years, the facility also hosted Formula Atlantic, Formula 1600, Formula 5000, Trans-Am, as well as NHRA-sanctioned drag racing.

Qualico Developments was the land owner in the latter years. The track closed in 1982, after the area was annexed by the City of Edmonton. Qualico then converted the land to housing. Edmonton would be without any form of professional racing until Capital City Raceway Park opened in 1991.

In popular culture
David Cronenberg's movie, Fast Company (1979), was primarily filmed at Edmonton International Speedway.

Major Series

Can-Am
 The thunderous Can-Am series raced in Edmonton from 1968-1973, where the race was known as the Klondike 200, and the primary sponsor was Molson Brewery.
 Denny Hulme won all four races from 1968 to 1971, while Mark Donohue won the 1972 and 1973 races driving a Porsche 917 for Roger Penske.
 Other well-known Can-Am drivers that raced at EIS included Bruce McLaren, Jackie Stewart, Peter Revson, Jacky Ickx, and Danny Sullivan.

Formula 5000
 The Canadian Road Racing Championship raced F5000 cars twice at EIS:
 June 22, 1969 (Winner: Eppie Wietzes, Lola)
 June 14, 1970 (Winner: Eppie Wietzes, McLaren)
 The Sports Car Club of America (SCCA) raced F5000 cars three times at EIS:
 May 24, 1970 (Winner: Ron Grable, Lola)
 August 1, 1971 (Winner: David Hobbs, McLaren)
 June 4, 1972 (Winner: David Hobbs, Lola)
 When the SCCA put full-bodies on F5000 cars and called them Can Am cars, this series raced once at EIS:
 August 16, 1981 (Winner: Geoff Brabham, VDS)

Formula Atlantic
 Formula Atlantic was originally called Formula B, and as FB it raced in Edmonton three times:
 June 20, 1971 (Winner: Jacques Couture, Lotus)
 June 25, 1972 (Winner: Ric Forrest, March)
 July 3, 1973 (Winner: Alan Lader)
 The speedway brought in the Formula Atlantic series from 1974–1977, and again in 1981:
 June 2, 1974 (Winner: Bill Brack, Lotus)
 May 24, 1975 (Winner: Bertil Roos, March)
 May 16, 1976 (Winner: Gilles Villeneuve, March)
 July 3, 1977 (Winner: Gilles Villeneuve, March)
 August 15, 1981 (Winner: Tim Coconis, Ralt)
 Other well-known Atlantic drivers that raced at EIS include Bobby Rahal, Keke Rosberg, Elliott Forbes-Robinson, Kevin Cogan, and Howdy Holmes.

Trans-Am
 The SCCA's Trans-Am series raced at EIS twice:
 June 20, 1971 (Winner: Mark Donohue, AMC Javelin)
 August 19, 1973 (Winner: John Greenwood, Chevrolet Corvette)

Lap Records
The fastest official race lap records at Edmonton International Speedway are listed as:

See also
 List of auto racing tracks in Canada

References

External links
 Detailed track map

Sports venues in Edmonton
Defunct motorsport venues in Canada
Defunct drag racing venues
1966 establishments in Alberta
Sports venues completed in 1953
1982 disestablishments in Alberta
Sports venues demolished in 1982
Defunct sports venues in Canada
Demolished buildings and structures in Alberta
Demolished sports venues
Motorsport venues in Alberta